Association football is the most popular sport, both in terms of participants and spectators, in Amsterdam.

Introduction
Amsterdam is home of the Eredivisie football club AFC Ajax. The stadium Johan Cruyff Arena is the home of Ajax. It is located in the south-east of the city next to the Amsterdam Bijlmer ArenA railway station. Before moving to their current location in 1996, Ajax played their regular matches in De Meer Stadion.

History
Amsterdam had a time when it was home to four professional and relatively successful football clubs. AFC Ajax, Blauw-Wit Amsterdam, AFC DWS, AVV De Volewijckers and later, FC Amsterdam, each with their own relatively long and rich histories.

Professional clubs

Amateur clubs

Defunct clubs

Honours
 Netherlands football champion (41)
 Ajax (34), 
 RAP (5)
 DWS (1)
 De Volewijckers (1)

Amsterdam derbies

Amsterdam Derby (Stadsderby) refers to matches played between professional and amateur football clubs of Amsterdam. Such clubs include AFC, Ajax, Blauw-Wit, DWS, JOS Watergraafsmeer, Swift, De Volewijckers, VVA and Zeeburgia. An Amsterdam Derby can be an individual match or an ongoing rivalry between clubs, players and fans.

Stadiums
 Johan Cruyff Arena: Hosted the 1998 UEFA Champions League Final and 2013 UEFA Europa League Final
 Amsterdam Olympic Stadium: Hosted the 1962 European Cup Final

Famous footballers from Amsterdam
 Rinus Michels
 Johan Cruyff

See also
Football in Netherlands

References